The Confederation of Unions for Professionals (Unio) is a national trade union centre in Norway.

The federation was formed in 2001 by unions, most of which were formerly part of the Academic and Professional Unions.  It has 13 affiliated unions and is politically neutral.

Affiliates

References

National trade union centers of Norway
2001 establishments in Norway
Trade unions established in 2001
Trade unions in Norway
Organisations based in Oslo